Sheppard Pratt at Ellicott City is a private psychiatric hospital located in Ellicott City, Maryland. It currently has a 20-bed adult unit, an 18-bed co-occurring disorders unit, an 18-bed crisis stabilization unit, a 22-bed adolescent unit, and an adult day hospital. The hospital is owned and operated by the Towson, Maryland based Sheppard Pratt Health System

Prior to its purchase by Sheppard Pratt the facility was known as Taylor Manor, one of only a dozen privately owned psychiatric facilities in the nation.  
 The hospital is expected to close with the opening of Sheppard Pratt at Elkridge in 2020. Most of the original structures have already been demolished as new plans for the Taylor Highlands development are already underway.

History
In 1907 Taylor Manor started as the Patapsco Manor Sanitarium built on property along New Cut road in Ellicott City owned by Dr. Rushmore White. The twenty person facility suffered a fire in 1923. In 1939 the facility was purchased by Issac H. Taylor and run as the Pinel Clinic. Taylor operated an optometrist business and Taylor's Furniture on Main Street. In 1948 the facility expanded to 48 beds, and in 1968 it expanded to 151 beds. The modern architecture circular rotunda stands out at the center of campus. The Ayrd library is named after Taylor Manor Hospital Psychiatric Award winner Frank J. Ayd, MD.

The campus property has been expanded and subdivided by the Taylor family. The southern portion became a county landfill and sections were sold for housing.  The campus acreage totaled  in 2000.  By 2000, Taylor Manor had an operating loss of $1.1 million a year on $15.8 million in revenues. In 2001 Taylor manor's programs were absorbed into the 1500 employee Sheppard Pratt system.
 
In 2006 Grassroots crisis intervention center operated a 33-bed homeless shelter on the campus while expanding their facilities at Atholton High School.

"Firsts" at Taylor Manor
In 1966, Taylor Manor started the first psychiatric treatment program in Maryland for adolescents. Dr. Irving Taylor collaborated with on-site research into the drug Thorazine becoming the first to use anti-psychotic medicine on patients.
In 1983 Robert L Custer took gambling research from Ohio to Taylor Manor to create a gambling addiction treatment center . He summarized that gambling addicts had a fear of dying and included a treatment plan that included repaying gambling debts.

Significant events

Areas of concentration
 Adult Psychiatry 
 Child and adolescent psychiatry

Notable staff
Frank J. Ayd – Pioneer in psychopharmacotherapy.

Notable patients
Ron Franklin (jockey)

See also
The Sheppard and Enoch Pratt Hospital
Chestnut Lodge Rockville Maryland.

References

Further reading
Affective Disorders Reassessed—1983 Frank J. Ayd, Irving J. Taylor, Bruce T. Taylor (M.D.)

Buildings and structures completed in the 1960s
Hospitals established in 1852
Hospital buildings completed in 1891
Hospital buildings completed in 1968
Hospitals in Maryland
1852 establishments in Maryland
Modernist architecture